The Royal Arch Route is a hiking trail on the South Rim of the Grand Canyon National Park, located in the U.S. state of Arizona.

See also
 The Grand Canyon
 List of trails in Grand Canyon National Park

External links

 Grand Canyon Explorer
 Royal Arch Loop

Hiking trails in Grand Canyon National Park
Grand Canyon, South Rim
Grand Canyon, South Rim (west)